The 1984 Blue Swords was an international figure skating competition in East Germany. First time in 1984 the competition was organised only for junior skaters. Medals were awarded in the disciplines of men's singles, ladies' singles and pair skating. 52 participants from 18 countries started in Karl-Marx-Stadt.

Men

Ladies

Pairs

References

Blue Swords
1984 in figure skating